Harold G. Christensen (June 25, 1926 – November 14, 2012) was an American attorney who served as United States Deputy Attorney General from 1988 to 1989.

At the age of 17, he served as a medic in the U.S. Navy during World War 2. He later attended the University of Utah for his undergraduate degree and the University of Michigan, where he obtained his law degree in 1951.

He briefly served as President Reagan's acting attorney general due to the resignation of Edwin Meese.

He died of cancer on November 14, 2012, in Salt Lake City, Utah at age 86.

References

External links

1926 births
2012 deaths
United States Deputy Attorneys General
Utah Republicans
Deaths from cancer in Utah
University of Utah alumni
University of Michigan Law School alumni